Alexander Ytterell (born July 1, 1991) is a Swedish professional ice-hockey player currently playing with Djurgårdens IF in the HockeyAllsvenskan (Allsv).

He played with Södertälje SK in the Elitserien during the 2010–11 Elitserien season. He later signed a two-year contract with HV71 in the SHL on May 12, 2017.

References

External links

1991 births
Living people
Bofors IK players
Djurgårdens IF Hockey players
Frederikshavn White Hawks players
HV71 players
KooKoo players
Leksands IF players
Modo Hockey players
Södertälje SK players
Swedish ice hockey defencemen
Tappara players